"Sick with Love" is the debut solo single by Australian singer and songwriter Robyn Loau. The song was released in September 1997 as the lead single from Loau's debut studio album, Malaria: The Lost Album (2008). It peaked at number 21 on the Australian ARIA Singles Chart and polled at number 71 on the Triple J Hottest 100, 1997 countdown.

Track listing

Charts

References 

1997 debut singles
1997 songs
Polydor Records singles
Robyn Loau songs
Songs written by Robyn Loau